The 2006 British Formula 3 International Series was the 56th British Formula 3 International Series season.  It commenced on 17 April 2006 and ended on 1 October after twenty-two races.

Drivers and teams
The following teams and drivers were competitors in the 2006 British Formula 3 International Series. The National class is for year-old Formula Three cars. Teams in the Invitation class are not series regulars, and do not compete for championship points.

Results

 1 Fastest lap recorded by Romain Grosjean, but he was ineligible to score the fastest lap point.

Standings

Championship Class

References

External links
 The official website of the British Formula 3 Championship

British Formula Three Championship seasons
Formula Three season
British
British Formula 3 Championship